Punta del Diavolo Lighthouse is an active lighthouse located on the western point of Isola San Domino,  one of the Tremiti in Apulia on the Adriatic Sea.

Description
On November 8, 1987, a mysterious explosion damaged the lighthouse, but the keeper, Domenico Calabrese, was off duty and survived. The lighthouse is completely automated,  powered by a solar unit and is managed by the Marina Militare with the identification code number 3844 E.F.

See also
 List of lighthouses in Italy
 Tremiti

References

External links

 Servizio Fari Marina Militare

Lighthouses in Italy